The Angolan Second Division Basketball Championship Campeonato Nacional de Basquetebol da Segunda Divisão, is the second tier men's basketball league in Angola. The competition, organized by the Angolan Basketball Federation and meant to be played on an annual basis, began in 2013.

The first edition took place at the Pavilhão do Benfica do Lubango, in Lubango with Sporting Clube de Benguela crowned champion, after beating Amigos de Viana 107–76 in the final.

Angola 2nd Division Basketball finals

Angola 2nd Division Basketball Championship stats leaders

Angola 2nd Division Rankings

See also
 BAI Basket
 Angola Cup
 Angola Super Cup
 Federação Angolana de Basquetebol

External links
Angolan Basketball Federation

References

 
Basketball leagues in Angola
Sports leagues established in 2013
2013 establishments in Angola